The egg fish goldfish is a fancy goldfish breed which lacks a dorsal fin and has a pronounced egg-shaped body. They look like ranchu but lack the "hood" or wen commonly found on ranchu goldfish, they also tend to have longer bodies.

Varieties 
The egg-fish goldfish is commonly kept in China and is the precursor to the Celestial, Lionhead, Pompom and the Bubble Eye goldfish varieties. In Japan, the egg-fish is called the Maruko.

The phoenix is a Chinese variety with an egg-shaped body and a long tail, without a dorsal fin and no headgrowth. It comes in all shades of color and scale types.

References

External links 

 Enhance Goldfish Color